Zack Phillips (born October 28, 1992) is a Canadian professional ice hockey centre. He is currently playing for the British Elite Ice Hockey League (EIHL) side, Fife Flyers. 

Phillips was most recently with German Oberliga side Starbulls Rosenheim, and prior to that iced in Poland for JKH GKS Jastrzębie and TH Unia Oświęcim.

Playing career
Phillips played his junior hockey for the Saint John Sea Dogs of the Quebec Major Junior Hockey League. He was selected 28th overall in the 2011 NHL Entry Draft by the Minnesota Wild.

On December 19, 2011, the Minnesota Wild signed Phillips to a three-year entry level contract.

In the 2014–15 season, on March 2, 2015, the Wild traded Phillips, while with AHL affiliate the Iowa Wild, to the Boston Bruins in exchange for Jared Knight. He was assigned to Boston's AHL affiliate the Providence Bruins.

In the following 2015–16 season, Phillips was unable to keep his initial scoring pace with the Providence Bruins and was assigned to ECHL affiliate, the Atlanta Gladiators. After 5 games with the Gladiators, Phillips was traded by the Bruins to the St. Louis Blues in exchange for future considerations on March 4, 2016.

At the conclusion of his NHL contract, Phillips chose to continue his professional career in Sweden, agreeing to a one-year deal Tingsryds AIF of the Allsvenskan on June 1, 2016.

After a spell in Sweden, Phillips moved to the UK to sign for EIHL side, the Nottingham Panthers on July 3, 2017. He then continued his journeyman career with Hungarian club, Fehérvár AV19, competing in the Austrian Hockey League (EBEL) for the 2018–19 season.

Having played three seasons abroad in Europe, Phillips returned to North America prior to the 2019–20 season, agreeing to a contract with the Toledo Walleye of the ECHL on August 7, 2019. Phillips made 12 appearances with the Walleye, registering just 3 points, before he was released on November 25, 2019. He joined the Worcester Railers, making 2 appearances before he was traded to join his third ECHL club for the season with the Norfolk Admirals on December 2, 2019. He registered a further 5 points in 17 games with the Admirals before leaving the ECHL to sign with Slovak club, HK Dukla Michalovce, for the remainder of the season.

In September 2020, Phillips signed with Polska Hokej Liga side JKH GKS Jastrzębie. In 2021, Phillips remained in Poland to sign for TH Unia Oświęcim, before leaving mid-season to join German club Starbulls Rosenheim.

In July 2022, Phillips agreed terms to return to the EIHL for the 2022–23 season - signing a one-year deal with the Fife Flyers.

Career statistics

References

External links

1992 births
Atlanta Gladiators players
Canadian ice hockey centres
Chicago Wolves players
HK Dukla Michalovce players
Fehérvár AV19 players
Fife Flyers players
Houston Aeros (1994–2013) players
Ice hockey people from New Brunswick
Iowa Wild players
JKH GKS Jastrzębie players
Kalamazoo Wings (ECHL) players
Living people
Minnesota Wild draft picks
National Hockey League first-round draft picks
Norfolk Admirals (ECHL) players
Nottingham Panthers players
Providence Bruins players
Saint John Sea Dogs players
Sportspeople from Fredericton
Starbulls Rosenheim players
TH Unia Oświęcim players
Tingsryds AIF players
Toledo Walleye players
Worcester Railers players
Canadian expatriate ice hockey players in England
Canadian expatriate ice hockey players in Hungary
Canadian expatriate ice hockey players in Sweden
Canadian expatriate ice hockey players in the United States
Canadian expatriate ice hockey players in Scotland
Canadian expatriate ice hockey players in Slovakia
Canadian expatriate ice hockey players in Poland
Canadian expatriate ice hockey players in Germany